A National Treasure is a tangible treasure, artifact, site, or building which is recognized by the South Korean government as having exceptional artistic, cultural and historical value to the country. The title is one of the eight State-designated heritage classifications assigned by the administrator of the Cultural Heritage Administration (CHA) in accordance with the Cultural Heritage Protection Act after deliberation by the Cultural Heritage Committee.

Many of the national treasures are popular tourist destinations such as Jongmyo royal ancestral shrine, Bulguksa, Seokguram, and Tripitaka Koreana at Haeinsa. As of May 2020, there are 327 distinct entries on the list, some composed of a large number of sub-entries. The treasures are numbered according to the order in which they were designated, not according to their individual value.

The National Treasures are designated within the heritage preservation system of the country.

History
The first list of Korean cultural treasures was designated by Governor-General of Korea in 1938 during the Japanese occupation with "The Act of Treasures of the Joseon dynasty".

In 1955, the South Korean government declared as National Treasures the items previously on the Korean Treasures Preservation Order issued during Japan's occupation of Korea. The current list dates to December 20, 1962, when the Cultural Protection Act was enacted by the Supreme Council for National Reconstruction. There were 116 items on the "National Treasures" list at that time, with others designated as "Treasures".

Numerous amendments have been made to the list since that time, most recently in 2021.

Living National Treasure are holders, or keepers of Intangible Cultural Property.

List of national treasures

1960s

Designated December 20, 1962

Designated March 3, 1964

117. Seated iron vairocana Buddha statue of Borimsa temple, Jangheung County
118. Gilt-bronze pensive maitreya bodhisattva, Samsung Museum of Art, Seoul
119. Standing gilt-bronze Buddha with inscription of the seventh year of Yeonga era, National Museum of Korea, Seoul
120. Bell of Yongjusa, Yongjusa temple, Hwaseong
121. Hahoetal and Byeongsantal masks, Andong
122. Three storied stone pagoda of Jinjeonsa temple site, Yangyang County

Designated February 28, 1966
123. Relics found from the five storied stone pagoda in Wanggung-ri, Iksan, Jeonju National Museum, Jeonju
124. Seated marble bodhisattva statue of Hansongsa temple, National Museum of Korea, Seoul
125. Green-glazed funeral urn with stone case, National Museum of Korea, Seoul

Designated September 16, 1967
126. Relics found inside three storied Seokgatap pagoda of Bulguksa temple, Gyeongju (28 subentries)

Designated December 19, 1968
127. Standing gilt-bronze avalokitesvara bodhisattva statue of Samyang-dong, National Museum of Korea, Seoul
128. Standing gilt-bronze avalokitesvara bodhisattva statue, Hoam Art Museum, Yongin
129. Standing gilt-bronze bodhisattva statue, Leeum Art Museum, Yongin
130. Five storied stone pagoda of Jukjang-dong, Seonsan, Gumi

Designated November 7, 1969

1970s

Designated December 30, 1970-December 21, 1971

Designated March 2, 1972
143. Bronze artifacts, estimated to be from 200-100 BC. A bronze rattle with eight bells and a bronze mirror 14.5 cm in diameter.  Found in Taegong-ri, Hwasun County, Jeollanam-do.  Stored at Gwangju National Museum, Gwangju. (6 subentries)
144. Rock-carved seated Buddha image at Mt. Wolchulsan,  Yeongam County

Designated June 24, 1972
145. Bronze brazier with demon mask decoration, Yongsan-gu, Seoul
146. Excavated relics from Gangwon-do, Hoam Art Museum, Yongin (4 subentries)

Designated May 4, 1973
147. Petroglyphs in Cheonjeon-ri, Ulju-gun, Ulsan

Designated July 10, 1973

Designated December 31, 1973

Designated July 9, 1974

154. Crown of Baekje.  A pair of 30.7 cm golden diadem ornaments, early 6th century (Baekje).  Found in the tomb of King Muryeong, Gongju-si, Chungcheongnam-do.
155. Crown of Baekje. The queen of King Muryeong's golden diadem ornaments, 22.6 cm.
156. A pair of king's earrings, made from gold and jade, early 6th century (Baekje). From the tomb of King Muryeong.
157. A pair of queen's earrings, made from gold. From the tomb of King Munyeong.
158. Two gold necklaces of the queen of King Muryeong, Gongju National Museum, Gongju
159. An 18.4 cm golden king's hairpin, early 6th century (Baekje dynasty). Found in the tomb of King Muryeong).
160. A pair of silver bracelets of the queen of King Muryeong, Gongju National Museum, Gongju
161. Bronze mirrors from the tomb of King Muryeong, Gongju National Museum, Gongju (3 subentries)
162. Seoksu, a guardian spirit sculpture with an iron antler, from the entrance of the tomb of King Muryeong.
163. A set of two granite epitaph plaques from tomb of King Muryeong—one for the king and one for his queen. 41.5 cm by 35.2 cm, by 5 cm and 4.7 cm.
164. Headrest, Gongju National Museum, Gongju
165. King's footrest, Gongju National Museum, Gongju
166. White porcelain jar with plum and bamboo designs in underglaze iron, National Museum of Korea, Seoul
167 Celadon wine pot in the shape of a human figure, National Museum of Korea, Seoul
168 Deleted. Originally held by white porcelain bottle with plum and chrysanthemum designs in underglaze iron, National Museum of Korea, Seoul as it was considered as a  rare example of 15th century porcelain in the Joseon dynasty, but was recently found to be a quite common chinese porcelain made  in 14th century Yuan dynasty of china.
169 Porcelain bottle with bamboo motif from Goryeo period, Hoam Art Museum, Yongin
170 Blue and white porcelain jar with plum, bird and bamboo designs, National Museum of Korea, Seoul
171. Bronze pedalled bowl, Hoam Art Museum, Yongin
172. Artifacts excavated from the Jinyang Jeong family tomb, Hoam Art Museum, Yongin
173. Seated celadon arhat with dot design in underglaze iron, Gangnam-gu, Seoul
174. Pair of gilt-bronze candlesticks from the Silla period, Hoam Art Museum, Yongin
175. White porcelain bowl with inlaid lotus-arabesque design, National Museum of Korea, Seoul
176. Blue and white porcelain jar with pine and bamboo designs and inscription of Hongchi, Dongguk University, Seoul
177. Buncheong placenta jar with stamped design, Korea University, Seoul
178. Buncheong flattened bottle with incised fish design, Seodaemun-gu, Seoul
179. Buncheong flattened bottle with lotus and fish designs, Horim Museum, Seoul

Designated December 31, 1974-April 23, 1976

Designated December 14, 1976
186. Standing gilt-bronze bodhisattva statue from Yangpyeong, National Museum of Korea, Seoul

Designated August 22, 1977
187. Five storied imitation-brick pagoda in Sanhae-ri,  Yeongyang County

Designated December 7, 1978

188. A gold and jade crown with pendants, Old Silla period.  Heavenly Horse Tomb (Cheonma-chong), Hwangnam-dong, Gyeongju City, Gyeongsangbuk-do.
189. A 19 cm high golden cap, Old Silla period, from the Heavenly Horse Tomb.
190. Gold girdle with pendants from the Heavenly Horse Tomb, Gyeongju National Museum, Gyeongju
191. A gold and jade crown with pendants, Old Silla period. Excavated from Hwangnamtaechong Tomb. The crown has been exhibited at National Museum of Korea from 2005, but Gyeongju National Museum has the ownership of it.
192. A 120 cm gold and jade girdle with pendants, Old Silla period.  Found in the North Mound of Hwangnamtaechong Tomb, Gyeongju City, Gyeongsangbuk-do.
193. A green-blue glass ewer, 25 cm high (reconstructed), from the Old Silla period (est. 500-600 AD).  Found in the South Mound of Hwangnamdaechong Tomb, Gyeongju, Gyeongsangbuk-do.
194. A golden necklace from the Old Silla period.  Found in the South Mound of Hwangnamdaechong Tomb.
195. Mounted cup with figurines from tomb of King Michu, Gyeongju National Museum, Gyeongju

Designated February 8, 1979

Designated May 22, 1979
197. Stupa to Buddhist Priest Bogak of Cheongnyongsa temple
198. Stele by King Jinheung of Silla Period in Danyang County.
199. Buddhist figures of Sinseonsa temple grotto at Mt. Danseoksan, Gyeongju

Designated April 30, 1979
200. Standing gilt-bronze bodhisattva statue, Busan Museum, Busan

1980s

Designated September 16, 1980

Designated March 18, 1981
202. Avatamsaka sutra, Jung-gu, Seoul
203. Avatamsaka sutra, Jung-gu, Seoul
204. Avatamsaka sutra, Jung-gu, Seoul
205. Goguryeo monument in Jungwon, Chungju

Designated May 22, 1982
206. Goryeo Buddhist printing blocks at Haeinsa temple, Hapcheon County (28 subentries)

Designated November 16, 1982
207. Saddle flap with 'heavenly horse' painting, from the Heavenly Horse Tomb, National Museum of Korea, Seoul

Designated December 7, 1982
208. Hexagonal gilt-bronze sarira case, Jikjisa temple, Gimcheon
209. Five storied stone pagoda with 'Bohyeop' inscription, Dongguk University, Seoul

Designated May 30, 1984
210. Sutra from the Goryeo period in silver ink (vol. 30), Yongin
211. Saddharmapundarika sutra in ink on white paper, Seongbo Culture Foundation, Seoul
212. Suramagma sutra, Dongguk University, Seoul

Designated August 6, 1984

213. Miniature gilt pagoda, Hoam Art Museum, Yongin
214. Bronze incense burner from Heungwangsa temple, Kaesong, Hoam Art Museum, Yongin
215. Sutra from the Goryeo period in silver ink (vol. 31), Yongin
216. Inwangjesaekdo, Clearing after rain in Mt. Inwangsan, painting by Jeong Seon, Hoam Art Museum, Yongin
217. Geumgangjeondo, Painting of Kumgangsan by Jeong Seon, Hoam Art Museum, Yongin
218. Painting of amitabha flanked by two bodhisattvas, Hoam Art Museum, Yongin
219. Porcelain jar from early Joseon Dynasty, Hoam Art Museum, Yongin
220. Porcelain bowl, Hoam Art Museum, Yongin

Designated November 15, 1984
221. Seated wooden manjusuri statue, Sang-wonsa temple, Pyeongchang County

Designated December 7, 1984
222. Blue and white porcelain jar with plum and bamboo designs, Horim Museum, Seoul

Designated January 8, 1985

223. Geunjeongjeon Hall in Gyeongbokgung Palace, Seoul
224. Gyeonghoeru Pavilion in Gyeongbokgung Palace, Seoul
225. Injeongjeon Hall in Changdeokgung Palace, Seoul
226. Myeongjeongjeon Hall in Changgyeonggung Palace, Seoul
227. The main hall, Jeongjeon, of Jongmyo royal ancestral shrine, Seoul

Designated March 3, 1985
228. Cheonsang Yeolcha Bunyajido, a stone carved planisphere. Korean Royal Museum, Seoul
229. Water clock of Borugak Pavilion, Korean Royal Museum, Seoul
230. Astronomical instrument and clock, Korea University, Seoul

Designated March 14, 1986

Designated October 15, 1986
232. Certificate of meritorious subject for Yi Hwa for his distinguished service in helping to establish the Joseon Kingdom, Jeongeup
233. Agalmatolite jar with inscription of second year of Yeongtae era, Busan Museum, Busan

Designated November 29, 1986
234. Saddharmapundarika sutra in silver on indigo paper, Hoam Art Museum, Yongin
235. Avatamsaka sutra in gold on indigo paper, Hoam Art Museum, Yongin

Designated March 9, 1987
236. West five storied pagoda of a temple site in Janghang-ri, Wolseong, Gyeongju.

Designated July 16, 1987
237. Gosan gugoksi hwabyeong, folding screen with calligraphy and painting, Goyang
238. Scrapbook of Prince Yi Yong, mid-15th century, Goyang

Designated December 26, 1987
239. Portrait of Song Siyeol, National Museum of Korea, Seoul
240. Portrait of Yun Duseo, Haenam County

Designated June 16, 1988
241. Mahaprajnaparamita Sutra, Hoam Art Museum, Yongin

Designated November 14, 1988
242. Silla monument in Bongpyeong, Uljin County

Designated December 28, 1988

Designated April 10, 1989
247. Standing gilt-bronze bodhisattva in Uidang, Gongju

Designated August 1, 1989 or thereafter

See also
Historic Sites of South Korea
National Treasure (North Korea)
Culture of Korea
History of Korea

Notes
 This list is drawn largely from the following:   and

References
National Museum of Korea, The (1985). Selected Treasures of National Museums of Korea.  Seoul: Samhwa Publishing.

External links

Heritage Classification, Cultural Heritage Administration of Korea
Korean National Heritage Online

 
Archaeology of Korea